Gino Nicholas Cimoli (December 18, 1929 – February 12, 2011) was an American professional baseball outfielder. He played in Major League Baseball (MLB) for the Brooklyn / Los Angeles Dodgers, St. Louis Cardinals, Pittsburgh Pirates, Milwaukee Braves, Kansas City Athletics, Baltimore Orioles, and Los Angeles Angels from 1956 through 1965. He was an MLB All-Star in 1957, and a member of the 1960 World Series champions.

Career
A high school all-star at Galileo High School in San Francisco, Cimoli signed as an amateur free agent with the Brooklyn Dodgers in 1949. He would make his Major League Baseball debut with the Dodgers on April 19, 1956.

On April 15, 1958, Cimoli became the first Major League batter to step into the batter's box on the West Coast when the Los Angeles Dodgers and the San Francisco Giants played their first game of the season at Seals Stadium in San Francisco. After the season, the Dodgers traded Cimoli to the St. Louis Cardinals for Wally Moon and Phil Paine. After the 1959 season, the Cardinals traded Cimoli to the Pittsburgh Pirates with Tom Cheney in exchange for Ron Kline.

Cimoli played on the Pirates' 1960 championship team, which defeated the New York Yankees in seven games. He was primarily the Pirates' fourth outfielder in 1960 and often platooned with center fielder Bill Virdon. After left fielder Bob Skinner injured his thumb in Game 1 of the World Series, Cimoli started Games 2–6 in left field. Cimoli returned to the bench in Game 7 when Skinner returned. In the eighth inning, with the Pirates trailing 7–4, Cimoli, pinch-hitting for pitcher Roy Face, led off with a single off Bobby Shantz, advanced to second on Virdon's bad-hop grounder, which struck Yankee shortstop Tony Kubek in the throat, then scored on Dick Groat's single, the first run in a five-run inning to give the Pirates a 9–7 lead. The Pirates gave the lead away in the ninth before finally winning the game in the bottom half on Bill Mazeroski's lead-off home run.

On June 15, 1961, the Pirates traded Cimoli to the Milwaukee Braves for Johnny Logan. The Kansas City Athletics selected Cimoli from the Braves in the Rule 5 draft after the season. The Athletics released Cimoli on May 29, 1964, and he signed with the Baltimore Orioles that day. Released by the Orioles before the 1965 season, Cimoli signed with the California Angels on April 10, 1965. He appeared in his final major league game on May 7, and was released on May 14.

Cimoli's baseball card in 1958 (No. 286, Topps) in which the background was painted out, shows him swinging a bat, without the bat — which was also painted out. (Source: Baseball Hall of Shame 4, Nash & Zullo)

Later life
After retiring from baseball, Cimoli worked as a delivery driver for United Parcel Service where, in 1990, the company honored Cimoli for completing 21 years of service without a traffic accident. Cimoli, then 60 years old and still working for the company, was now referred to as "The Lou Gehrig of UPS."

See also

List of Major League Baseball annual triples leaders

External links

Baseball Hall of Fame: Colorful Cimoli Always a Good Quote

1929 births
2011 deaths
Baseball players from San Francisco
Baltimore Orioles players
Brooklyn Dodgers players
Fort Worth Cats players
Kansas City Athletics players
Los Angeles Angels players
Los Angeles Dodgers players
Major League Baseball center fielders
Major League Baseball right fielders
Milwaukee Braves players
Montreal Royals players
Nashua Dodgers players
National League All-Stars
Pittsburgh Pirates players
Rochester Red Wings players
St. Louis Cardinals players
St. Paul Saints (AA) players
Spokane Indians players
Sportspeople from Roseville, California